The 1986 MAAC men's basketball tournament was held February 27–March 1 at the Meadowlands Arena in East Rutherford, New Jersey.

Fairfield defeated  in the championship game, 67–64, to win their first MAAC men's basketball tournament.

The Stags received a bid to the 1986 NCAA tournament – the first NCAA Tournament appearance in school history – where they were beaten by Illinois in the opening round, 75–51.

Format
All eight of the conference's members participated in the tournament field. They were seeded based on regular season conference records, with all teams starting play in the quarterfinal round.

All games were played at a neutral site at the Meadowlands Arena in East Rutherford, New Jersey.

Bracket

References

MAAC men's basketball tournament
1985–86 Metro Atlantic Athletic Conference men's basketball season
1986 in sports in New Jersey